Pallapu Chamavaram is a village in Rowthulapudi Mandal, Kakinada district in the state of Andhra Pradesh in India.

Geography 

Demographics 
 India census, Pallapu Chamavaram had a population of 1,510, out of which 767 were male and 743 were female. Population of children below 6 years of age were 142. The literacy rate of the village is 57.75%.

References 

Villages in Rowthulapudi mandal